Śmietki Małe  is a settlement in the administrative district of Gmina Mikołajki, within Mrągowo County, Warmian-Masurian Voivodeship, in northern Poland.

References

Villages in Mrągowo County